USCGC Alexander Hamilton (WPG-34) was a . She was named after Founding Father and the first U.S. Secretary of the Treasury, Alexander Hamilton. Sunk after an attack by a German U-boat in January 1942, the Hamilton was the U.S. Coast Guard's first loss of World War II.

Design
The design of the Alexander Hamilton was based on the U.S. Navy's Erie-class of gunboats. This Treasury-class of U.S. Coast Guard cutters was sometimes referred to as the Secretary-class.

History
The Hamilton was built at the New York Navy Yard for the U.S. Coast Guard. Her keel was laid on September 11, 1935 and she was launched on January 6, 1937. The U.S. Coast Guard had truncated her name to Hamilton that year, but resumed using the full name in January 1942 after a request by the U.S. Navy to avoid confusion with the destroyer .

Sinking
The explosion killed twenty men instantly and the total death toll was 26. After she capsized on January 30, salvage attempts were abandoned and the American destroyer  fired upon the wreck three times to send her to the bottom of the sea,  from the coast.

Discovery of shipwreck
On August 19, 2009, the Icelandic Coast Guard discovered a shipwreck believed to be the Hamilton in Faxaflói. After she was positively identified using the technology of a Gavia AUV (Autonomous Underwater Vehicle), Microsoft co-founder Paul Allen flew to Iceland in August 2010 with an entourage to visit the wreck in a mini-submarine. His luxury yacht, the Octopus, arrived separately at Reykjavík Harbor for the trip.

On June 26, 2011, a team of divers including Team Blue Immersions Jonas Samuelsson, Aron Arngrimsson and Valgeir Petursson left Reykjavik at 5am departing for Alexander Hamilton wreck. At 30 miles out and 95 meters down, the wreck lies upside down. This is the first dive team that ever dived this wreck.

The dive went without any problems and the conditions were better than expected. The sea at the surface was pretty rough and most (including Icelandic Coast Guard) warned not to take the boat out, saying the dive was impossible to conduct under current conditions. Temperature was 7° C (44.6° F) at 90 meters, which was warmer than divers prepared for.

During the deep dive the divers set three Icelandic diving records: Deepest wreck dive in Iceland, deepest sea dive in Iceland, and deepest dive ever made in Iceland.

Attaching memorial plaque on Alexander Hamilton 
Team Blue Immersion, including divers Jonas Samuelsson, Aron Arngrimsson, Erik Brown, Chris Haslam in partnership with the diving company OceanReef returned to Alexander Hamilton in August 2013. On the assignment from the families related to the men that served on the cutter during World War II the Team dived down and attached a memorial plaque on the ship. The plaque listed all men that served and died during the attack by the German Type VII submarine on 29 January 1942, just seven and a half weeks after the attack on Pearl Harbor.

On August 10, just two days before the Team Blue Immersions reached the 1937 Alexander Hamilton, a new  was launched in the water for the first time. This ship is the sixth cutter named after Alexander Hamilton.

Awards
American Defense Service Medal
American Campaign Medal
European-African-Middle Eastern Campaign Medal with one battle star
World War II Victory Medal

References

This article includes text from the public domain website of the Office of the Historian, United States Coast Guard. The entry can be found here.

Further reading

External links

Alexander Hamilton at the Naval Historical Center
USS Alexander Hamilton at HistoryCentral.com
Loss of USCGC Alexander Hamilton (WPG 34) at the Destroyer History Foundation
Wreck of USCGC Alexander Hamilton (WPG 34) at Wikimapia
A video of the expedition can be found here

Ships built in Brooklyn
Ships of the United States Coast Guard
Shipwrecks of Iceland
Treasury-class cutters
World War II patrol vessels of the United States
World War II shipwrecks in the Atlantic Ocean
1937 ships
Maritime incidents in January 1942
Ships sunk by German submarines in World War II
Ships named for Founding Fathers of the United States